Tian Zhigang (born 11 October 1956) is a Chinese immunologist who is a professor and doctoral supervisor at the School of Life Sciences, University of Science and Technology of China, chairman of Chinese Society for Immunology, and an academician of the Chinese Academy of Engineering.

Biography 
Tian was born in Ye County (now Laizhou), Shandong, on 11 October 1956. He received his Bachelor of Medicine degree from Shanxi Medical University in 1982, Master of Immunology from Shandong Academy of Medical Sciences (now Shandong First Medical University) in 1985, and Doctor of Immunology from Norman Bethune Health Science Center of Jilin University in 1989. In 1993, he became a researcher at the Institute of Cancer Research, National Institutes of Health.

He is now a professor and doctoral supervisor at the School of Life Sciences, University of Science and Technology of China, concurrently serving as chairman of Chinese Society for Immunology.

Honours and awards 
 2008 State Natural Science Award (Second Class)
 2012 State Science and Technology Progress Award (Second Class)
 2015 Science and Technology Progress Award of the Ho Leung Ho Lee Foundation
 27 November 2017 Member of the Chinese Academy of Engineering (CAE)
 2020 State Natural Science Award (Second Class)

References 

1956 births
Living people
People from Laizhou
Engineers from Shandong
Shanxi Medical University alumni
Jilin University alumni
Academic staff of the University of Science and Technology of China
Chinese immunologists
Members of the Chinese Academy of Engineering